Philippe Van Leeuw is a Belgian film director, screenwriter and cinematographer. He made his feature-length debut in 2009 with The Day God Walked Away. In 2017, he wrote and directed Insyriated, which premiered at the 67th Berlin International Film Festival. At the 8th Magritte Awards, the film won all six awards it was nominated for, tying the Magritte Awards record for most awards won (alongside Mr. Nobody), including Best Film and Best Director for Van Leeuw.

Filmography 
 2016: Une de perdue! (Short) 
 2016: Saigneurs (Documentary) 
 2013: Stable Unstable
 2012: Asfouri
 2009: Mouton noir
 2008: Terre (Short) 
 2008: God's Offices
 2007: Rock'n Roll Circu
 2007: Fin (Short) 
 2007: Demented

References

External links

1954 births
Living people
Belgian cinematographers
Belgian film directors
Belgian screenwriters
Magritte Award winners